The brown ghost knifefish (Apteronotus leptorhynchus) is a species of weakly electric knifefish in the family Apteronotidae.  Only the brown ghost knifefish, a vertebrate, has been proven to have negligible brain aging thus far. In the current study, the basic development patterns of this species are examined, and the hypothesis that minimum senescence is associated with indeterminate growth and the lack of reproductive senescence is assessed. They are a hardy species that eats tiny fish, crustaceans, and insect larvae in the nature, but in an aquarium, they often take to frozen foods rather quickly.

See also
Electric fish
Bioelectromagnetism

References

External links
 Presentation of My Model System: The Electric Fish - Dr. Marsat
 Neuroscience research using brown ghost knifefish as a model system - Dr. Chacron

Apteronotidae
Freshwater fish of Brazil
Freshwater fish of Colombia
Fish of French Guiana
Fish of Guyana
Freshwater fish of Peru
Fish of Suriname
Fish of Venezuela
Fish of the Amazon basin
Fish described in 1912
Taxa named by Max Mapes Ellis